The First Congregational Church of East Haven (also known as Old Stone Church) is a historic church at 251 Main Street in East Haven, Connecticut. It was built in 1772-74 by George Lancraft, a local builder, and is one of Connecticut's few surviving pre-Revolutionary churches.  It is also one of New England's oldest stone churches, preceded principally by King's Chapel in Boston, Massachusetts.  The church was listed on the National Register of Historic Places in 1982.  The congregation is affiliated with the United Church of Christ.

Description and history
The First Congregational Church of East Haven occupies a prominent position at the eastern end of the town green in the center of East Haven.  It is a 2-1/2 story structure, built out of red standstone quarried in nearby Fair Haven, and mortared with a combination of historic lime mortar and more recent cement mortar.  A square tower rises from the west-facing main facade, with three levels of base surmounted by a clock stage, a wooden belfry with late Georgian features, and an octagonal steeple.  Entrances are set in the bays flanking the tower.  Windows are set in rectangular openings with stone sills and flared lintels, and there is a slightly projecting stringcourse between the floors.  The interior is reflective of an 1850 renovation, in which the pulpit was moved from the long north wall to the east end.  At that time, the main entrance was also relocated; it had originally been placed at the center of the long south wall, a traditional placement for colonial meeting houses.

The church was built in 1772-74 by George Lancraft, a stonemason from Fair Haven.  It was designed in part by Lancraft and by the congregation's building committee, which made alterations (including lengthening the building and adding the tower) while it was under construction.  The church was looted of its silver during a British raid in the American Revolutionary War.

See also
National Register of Historic Places listings in New Haven County, Connecticut

References

External links

Church website

United Church of Christ churches in Connecticut
Churches on the National Register of Historic Places in Connecticut
Churches completed in 1774
East Haven, Connecticut
Churches in New Haven County, Connecticut
National Register of Historic Places in New Haven County, Connecticut
18th-century churches in the United States
Congregational churches in Connecticut